Histoire(s) du cinéma is an 8-part video project begun by Jean-Luc Godard in the late 1980s and completed in 1998. The longest, at 266 minutes, and one of the most complex of Godard's films, Histoire(s) du cinéma is an examination of the history of the concept of cinema and how it relates to the 20th century; in this sense, it can also be considered a critique of the 20th century and how it perceives itself. The project is widely considered Godard's magnum opus.

Histoire(s) du cinéma is always referred to by its French title, because of the untranslatable word play it implies: histoire means both "history" and "story," and the s in parentheses gives the possibility of a plural. Therefore, the phrase Histoire(s) du cinéma simultaneously means The History of Cinema, Histories of Cinema, The Story of Cinema and Stories of Cinema. Similar double or triple meanings, as well as puns, are a recurring motif throughout Histoire(s) and much of Godard's work.

The film was screened out of competition at the 1988 Cannes Film Festival. Nine years later, it was screened in the Un Certain Regard section at the 1997 Festival.

The soundtrack was released as a 5-CD boxed set on the ECM record label.

In 2012, it was voted the 48th greatest film of all time in a poll of film directors by Sight & Sound magazine.

Content 
Histoire(s) du cinéma is conceived as a cinematic painting that brings together the elements of the novel and of painting. As cinema, it constructs into one whole three interrelated directions of enquiry: what the century has done to cinema; what cinema has done to the century; what makes up the image (cinematic or otherwise) in general. Above and beyond its scholarly dimension, Histoire(s) involves a positive project of the reinvention of cinema through the realization of Godard's earlier ideas on the history of cinema, and the cinematic modes of thought and history, along with establishing "metacinema" as a way to view the world, following Henri Bergson and Gilles Deleuze. At the same time, Godard seeks to push the limits of cinema in order to bring about his "videographic refashioning of cinema in the technical, ontological, and philosophical manners necessarily involves bringing cinema to its limits".

Episodes
Histoire(s) du cinéma consists of 4 chapters, each one subdivided into two parts, making for a total of 8 episodes. The first two episodes, Toutes les histoires (1988) and Une histoire seule (1989) run 52 minutes and 42 minutes, respectively; the remaining 6 episodes, premiered 1997 - 1998, run under 40 minutes each.
 Chapter 1(a) : 51 min.
 Toutes les histoires (1988) - All the (Hi)stories
 Chapter 1(b) : 42 min.
 Une Histoire seule (1989) - A Single (Hi)story
 Chapter 2(a) : 26 min.
 Seul le cinéma (1997) - Only Cinema
 Chapter 2(b) : 28 min.
 Fatale beauté (1997) - Deadly Beauty
 Chapter 3(a) : 27 min.
 La Monnaie de l’absolu (1998) - The Coin of the Absolute
 Chapter 3(b) : 27 min.
 Une Vague Nouvelle (1998) - A New Wave
 Chapter 4(a) : 27 min.
 Le Contrôle de l’univers (1998) - The Control of the Universe
 Chapter 4(b) : 38 min.
 Les Signes parmi nous (1998) - The Signs Among Us

Films referenced and quoted

Histoire(s) du cinéma is composed almost entirely of visual and auditory quotations from films, some famous and some obscure.
The sources of referenced films and literary quotations are delineated chronologically by the film critic Céline Scemama-Heard, the author of Histoire(s) du cinéma de Jean-Luc Godard. La force faible d’un art.

This is a partial list of works Godard drew upon to create the project; a complete list would number hundreds of entries.
 An American in Paris
 The Barefoot Contessa Bicycle Thieves'''
 The Docks of New York The Green Ray A King in New York Man Hunt Notorious
 The Night of the Hunter Only Angels Have Wings The Passion of Joan of Arc, which Godard had featured earlier in Vivre Sa Vie Rear Window Scarface Snow White and the Seven Dwarfs Teorema Zéro de conduite Reception 
Critical reception for Histoire(s) du cinéma has been highly positive. Marjorie Baumgarten, reviewing for the Austin Chronicle said: "Few filmmakers would be able to mount a discourse on the 20th century's art and thought process as broad and extensive as this".  Australian film critic Adrian Martin, in a four-star review, commented: "It is the form of this remembered, necessarily scrappy, haunted, sad history which Godard evokes in all the prodigious techniques of his Histoire(s) du cinéma." Calling it an "intellectual striptease", New York Times film critic Dave Kehr wrote: "Perhaps, like Joyce’s Finnegans Wake, this is not a work to be read but a work to be read in: to be picked up and put down, sampled and considered, over a period of time. Jean-Luc Godard took 30 years to compose his Histoire(s). It might take just as long to absorb it." Jonathan Rosenbaum in the Chicago Reader agreed, stating: "For better and for worse, it's comparable to James Joyce's Finnegans Wake in both its difficulty and its playfulness". In the academic journal Film Quarterly, James S. Williams described the project as "Godard’s gift to us: a threnody of love" and as offering "irrefutable proof" that "the forms of art—the forms that think—can help lay the basis for new forms of being". Alifeleti Brown, writing for Senses of Cinema, praised the series as being "Godard’s most devastating accomplishment as filmmaker/critic/artist/poet/historian". Michael Wood compared the series to an "archaeology of mind, the apparently disordered rescue of a lifetime’s memory of film" in a piece for the London Review of BooksAvailability
It was released on DVD by Olive Films on December 6, 2011.

See alsoThe Story of Film, a 2011 documentary film by Mark Cousins similar in content
 Cinephilia
 French New Wave

Notes

References

Further reading
 Scemama-Heard, Céline, Histoire(s) du cinéma de Jean-Luc Godard. La force faible d’un art, L’Harmattan, Paris, 2006.  
Kim, Jihoon. "Video, the Cinematic, and the Post-Cinematic: On Jean-Luc Godard's Histoire(s) Du Cinéma." Journal of Film and Video, vol. 70, no. 2, 2018, pp. 3–20.''

External links
 La partition des Histoire(s) du cinéma de Jean-Luc Godard par Céline Scemama 
Interview: Jean-Luc Godard
 
 
 
 
 
 
 
 
 
 Annotated versions of Histoires(s) du cinéma at 0xDB

1988 films
1989 films
1997 films
1998 films
Swiss documentary films
French film series
French avant-garde and experimental films
1980s French-language films
Documentary films about the film industry
Films directed by Jean-Luc Godard
French documentary films
Avant-garde and experimental film series
1990s avant-garde and experimental films
Collage television
Collage film
Essays about film
French-language Swiss films
Swiss avant-garde and experimental films
1980s French films
1990s French films